Deryck Jason Whibley (born 21 March 1980), nicknamed Bizzy D, is a Canadian musician, singer, songwriter and record producer, best known for his work as the lead vocalist, rhythm guitarist, keyboardist, main songwriter, producer, founder and only constant member of the rock band Sum 41.

Recording career

Sum 41

Whibley formed Sum 41 with drummer Steve Jocz, bassist Richard Roy and vocalist Jon Marshall. They were originally called Kaspir, and were a NOFX cover band. In 1999, the band signed an international record deal with Island Records. The band released their debut album, "Half Hour of Power" in 2000, then All Killer No Filler in 2001. The band achieved mainstream success with their first single from the album, "Fat Lip", which reached number-one on the Billboard Modern Rock Tracks chart and remains the band's most successful single to date. All Killer No Filler was certified platinum in the United States, Canada and in the UK. The band has since released six more studio albums: Does This Look Infected? (2002), Chuck (2004), Underclass Hero (2007), Screaming Bloody Murder (2011), 13 Voices (2016), and Order in Decline (2019). The three albums before Screaming Bloody Murder have been certified platinum in Canada.

The band often performs more than 300 times each year and holds long global tours, most of which last more than a year. They have been nominated for seven Juno Awards and have won twice (Group of the Year in 2002 and Rock Album of the Year for Chuck in 2005). Their fifth studio album, Screaming Bloody Murder, was released on March 29, 2011. During the Screaming Bloody Murder Tour, the band added Whibley's cousin Matt Whibley on keyboard.

Solo work
Besides Sum 41, Whibley developed a professional career in the music industry as producer and manager. He was part of Bunk Rock Music, a music management and production company. He produced for No Warning with the company as well. Since parting ways with Greig Nori, he sold his part of the company in early 2005.

During the Sum 41 hiatus in 2005 and 2006, he worked with Tommy Lee on guitar and backing vocals for his album, Tommyland: The Ride, and A Million in Prizes: The Anthology with Iggy Pop.

He worked as the producer of We Have an Emergency, the debut album by Sum 41 co-member Jason McCaslin's side project The Operation M.D. In 2007, he mixed the debut album of the band Permanent Me. He was also involved with the Avril Lavigne album, The Best Damn Thing, where he produced and played guitar.

Besides his musical career, he has worked on occasion as an actor. He portrayed the character Tony in the movie Dirty Love, and himself as a guest character in King of the Hill.

In November 2007, Whibley suffered a herniated disc while drumming on the song "Pain for Pleasure". This happened while Sum 41 was on tour with Finger Eleven, and the remainder of the Strength in Numbers Tour was canceled although Finger Eleven did travel to Winnipeg, Manitoba to play the show with Die Mannequin and Inward Eye in replacement of Sum 41.

On the Operation M.D.'s second album Birds + Bee Stings, which was released on June 29, 2010, Whibley mixed one track entitled "Sick + Twisted". He also played keyboard and piano on the same track. He also joined the band live, playing guitar on this song, on December 21, 2010, at the Horseshoe Tavern in Toronto.

Whibley contributed some guitar to Tommy Lee's side project Methods of Mayhem's second album A Public Disservice Announcement which was released on September 21, 2010.

He co-wrote the songs "Broken Pieces", "Over and Out" and "Lost in Reality" with 5 Seconds of Summer, which appeared on their She's Kinda Hot EP.

On February 18, 2022, Whibley released a collaboration track with Simple Plan called "Ruin My Life".

Instruments
Whibley uses a black customized '72 Fender Telecaster Deluxe live with his well-known red X's for decoration and good luck. He has also put out a signature guitar with Squier, a sub-brand of Fender. The signature Squier comes in black and Olympic white, sports the two red X's and has one humbucking pickup in the bridge position, which is a Seymour Duncan Designed HB-102. It also has his signature "Deryck" written on the headstock. Whibley has used many Gibson guitars such as the Flying V, Les Paul, SG and a Gibson Marauder, which was his first guitar given to him by his mother, and has been used in some of the band's videos such as "Fat Lip" and "In Too Deep". According to the October 2007 issue of Rock Sound magazine, he also uses '59 Les Paul Reissues, '52 Telecaster Reissues,  Telefunken and Neumann mics, Plexi 100 watt Marshall Heads and Cabinets and Spectraflex cables.

Personal life
Whibley was born in the Toronto suburb of Scarborough and raised in Ajax, Ontario, and attended Southwood Park Public School. He grew up in a single parent household. Whibley has an interest in architecture and has said he would like to design houses if he was not a musician. As a teenager, he attended Exeter High School. It was there that he and his bandmates were discovered while playing at their War of the Bands.  In high school, Whibley was the captain of his basketball team.

In 2003, Whibley dated Hilton Hotels heiress and reality TV celebrity Paris Hilton.

Whibley married fellow singer Avril Lavigne in 2006. The couple occasionally performed together and have spoken about their relationship in interviews. Whibley and Lavigne began dating when she was 19 years old, after being friends since she was 17.

The wedding was held on July 15, 2006. About 110 guests attended the wedding, which was held at a private estate in Montecito, California.

After a little over three years of marriage Lavigne filed for divorce on October 9, 2009 and the divorce was finalised on November 16, 2010.

On August 30, 2015, Whibley married model Ariana Cooper in Los Angeles. Their first child was born in March 2020. Their second child was born in March 2023.

Health issues
Whibley has chronic back pain due to a series of back injuries, starting with a slipped disc during a 2007 concert. 
On August 5, 2010, Whibley was hospitalized after he was attacked in a bar in Japan late at night by three unknown individuals. After an MRI scan, it was revealed that Whibley herniated a disc in his back for the fourteenth time. Although advised against performing, Whibley rejoined the band on August 8 in Osaka for the Summer Sonic Festival. The back injuries, alongside severe anxiety, caused Whibley to self-medicate with alcohol. Whibley again injured his back in April 2013, causing him to miss shows.

On May 17, 2014, Whibley announced that, a month earlier, he had been hospitalized for alcoholism with severe liver and kidney damage.

Discography

With Sum 41

 Half Hour of Power (2000)
 All Killer No Filler (2001)
 Does This Look Infected? (2002)
 Chuck (2004)
 Underclass Hero (2007)
 Screaming Bloody Murder (2011)
 13 Voices (2016)
 Order in Decline (2019)
 Heaven and Hell (TBA)

References

External links

Deryck Whibley's official site
Sum 41's official site

Deryck Whibley's official Twitter account

Living people
Canadian expatriate musicians in the United States
Canadian male film actors
Canadian punk rock singers
Canadian rock guitarists
Canadian male guitarists
Canadian record producers
Canadian singer-songwriters
Musicians from Toronto
People from Scarborough, Toronto
Pop punk singers
Rhythm guitarists
Sum 41 members
Alternative metal guitarists
Avril Lavigne
21st-century Canadian guitarists
21st-century Canadian male singers
20th-century Canadian guitarists
20th-century Canadian male singers
1980 births